{{DISPLAYTITLE:C25H36O3}}
The molecular formula C25H36O3 (molar mass: 384.552 g/mol) may refer to:

 Estradiol enantate
 Nandrolone cyclohexanecarboxylate
 Variecolactone

Molecular formulas